The Minister for Health and Aged Care is the position in the Australian cabinet responsible for national health and wellbeing and medical research. The incumbent Minister is Labor MP Mark Butler.

In the Government of Australia, the minister is responsible for national health and medical research policy, providing direction and oversight of the Department of Health and Aged Care.

History 
Under Section 55(ix) of the Australian Constitution, the Commonwealth Parliament had the power to "make laws for the peace, order and good government of the Commonwealth with respect to Quarantine." This was the only area of public health in which the Commonwealth had authority at the time of Federation. The federal parliament did not use this power until the proclamation of the Quarantine Act 1908, on 30 March 1908. The control of the administration of quarantine was under the administration of the Minister for Trade and Customs from 1908 until 1921.  This Minister's responsibilities in health matters increased as the Australian Government took a greater role in the provision of public health services during the early 20th century, in particular after the First World War.

A separate Department of Health was established on 10 March 1921, and the position of Minister for Health was then formally created in the fifth Hughes Ministry. The role of the Department of Health has continued to expand and further federal responsibility for health was authorised by the passage, at referendum, of a constitutional amendment in 1946. From 1987 until the establishment of the current department in 2013, the department controlled by the minister had various different names – Department of Community Services and Health (1987–1991), Department of Health, Housing and Community Services (1991–1993), Department of Health, Housing, Local Government and Community Services (1993), Department of Human Services and Health (1993–1996), Department of Health and Family Services (1996–1998), Department of Health and Aged Care (1998–2001), and Department of Health and Ageing (2001–2013).

Section 51 (xxiiiA) of the Constitution now states the Commonwealth (federal) Parliament has the power to
make laws for the peace, order and good government of the Commonwealth [of Australia] with respect to the provision of maternity allowances, widows' pensions, child endowment, unemployment, pharmaceutical, sickness and hospital benefits, medical and dental services (but not so as to authorise any form of civil conscription), benefits to students and family allowances.
As a result of this amendment the federal government now has a key role in financing and providing medical services through entities such as Medicare and the Pharmaceutical Benefits Scheme.

From 1972 to 1975 under Doug Everingham, the Ministry was named the "Ministry of Helth [sic]" in some informal contexts due to Everingham's support of Spelling Reform.

List of Ministers for Health
The following individuals have been appointed as Minister for Health, or any of its precedent titles:

Notes
 Barnard was part of a two-man ministry that comprised just Gough Whitlam and Barnard for fourteen days until the full ministry was announced.
 Doug Everingham was a supporter of Spelling Reform and he preferred to spell it "Helth", but this was not the formal spelling of the portfolio's name (see above).
 Morrison was appointed as Minister for Health by the Governor-General on Morrison's advice in March 2020, with both Morrison and Hunt holding the position of Minister for Health until May 2022. However, the appointment of Morrison was not made public until August 2022.
 Senator Gallagher is part of an interim Albanese ministry that consisted of Anthony Albanese, Richard Marles, Penny Wong, Jim Chalmers and herself until the full ministry was sworn in on 1 June 2022.

List of Ministers for Aged Care
The following individuals have been appointed as the Minister for Aged Care, or any of its precedent titles: The position, since January 2017, is a separate outer ministry role that supplements the cabinet role of the Minister for Heath and Aged Care.

List of Assistant Ministers of Health and Aged Care
The following individual has been appointed as Assistant Ministers of Health and Aged Care, or any of its precedent titles:

List of Assistant Ministers for Indigenous Health
The following individuals have been appointed as Assistant Minister for Indigenous Health, or any of its precedent titles:

List of Assistant Minister for Rural and Regional Health
The following individuals have been appointed as Assistant Minister for Rural and Regional Health, or any of its precedent titles:

List of Assistant Minister for Mental Health and Suicide Prevention
The following individuals have been appointed as Assistant Minister for Mental Health and Suicide Prevention, or any of its precedent titles:

References

External links

 

Ministers for Health
Health and Aged Care
Australian Ministers for Health